Turkey entered the Eurovision Song Contest 1999 with Tuba Önal and Grup Mistik with the song "Dön Artık".

Before Eurovision

22. Eurovision Şarkı Yarışması Türkiye Finali 
The final took place on 12 March 1999 at the TRT Studios in Ankara, hosted by Ömer Önder and Gülşah Banda. Ten songs competed and the winner was determined by an expert jury. Only the top three songs were announced.

At Eurovision
Önal performed his song 7th on the night of the contest, following Slovenia and preceding Norway. At the close of the voting it had received 21 points, placing 16th in a field of 23.

Voting

References

1999
Countries in the Eurovision Song Contest 1999
Eurovision